UDG may refer to:

Universities 
 University of Girona, a university located in the city of Girona, Spain.
 University of Granma, a university located in Bayamo, Cuba.
 University of Guadalajara, a university located in the city of Guadalajara, Mexico
 University of Donja Gorica, a university located in the city of Podgorica, Montenegro

Science
 Uracil-DNA glycosylase, an enzyme which excises uracils from DNA
 Double-stranded uracil-DNA glycosylase, an enzyme
 Ultra diffuse galaxy
 Unit disk graph from geometric graph theory

Others 
 udg, the ISO 639-3 code for the Muduga language
 UDG (band), Czech pop rock band from town Ústí nad Labem.
 UTMC Development Group, a UK local authority led UTMC management group
 User-defined graphic: on early home computers, a small graphic created by the user and added to the character set.
Danganronpa Another Episode: Ultra Despair Girls